Salomon Korn (born 4 June 1943 in Lublin, Poland) is a German architect and an Honorary Senator of University Heidelberg. Since 1999 he serves as Chairman of the Jewish Community of Frankfurt am Main and since 2003 as Vice president of the Central Council of Jews in Germany.

Life
Salomon Korn's grandfather was a rabbi in Lublin, Poland. He was born as the eldest of three brothers in the Lublin ghetto. After the fall of the Nazi regime, he and his parents were transferred  to a camp for displaced persons in Frankfurt-Zeilsheim. The family had planned to emigrate to the USA or to Israel, but moved emigration over and over again. Korn visited the Helmholtz School during this time. His father successfully established a real estate business. In 1964 he married Maruscha Rawicki. The couple has three children. Korn studied architecture and sociology in Berlin and Darmstadt. In 1976, he achieved a PhD with a study on the reform of the prison system. His brother  (born 1946) became a theatre director.

He became the architect of the Jewish Community Center in Frankfurt am Main that opened in 1986. On that occasion, Salomon Korn stated: "Someone who builds a house, wants to remain — and hopes for security." A week after the opening ceremony, he was elected to the board of the Jewish Community of Frankfurt. In 1999 he became the chairman.

Korn serves in several foundations and cultural and scientific institutions such as the Ludwig Börne foundation and the Foundation for the Promotion of the Scientific Relations of the Johann Wolfgang Goethe University in Frankfurt. He is member of the Board of Trustees of the Ignatz Bubis Award for mutual understanding, of the foundation Monument to the murdered Jews of Europe, of the Senate of the Deutsche Nationalstiftung and a Board Member of the Aktion Sühnezeichen Friedensdienste. He serves in honorary functions for the Opera in the Abbey ruins of Bad Hersfeld, the German Film Institut and the Sigmund Freud Institute, both in Frankfurt/Main. He is a member of the advisory council of the American Jewish Committee in Berlin, of the Kuratoriums of the Leo Baeck Instituts and of the Federal Foundation Jüdisches Museum Berlin. He also serves in several scientific committees.

In 2003 he was elected Vice President of the Central Council of Jews in Germany. He has repeatedly declined to be a candidate for the presidency of this institution.

He published works on social science and architectural history. In the 1990s, Korn participated with critical contributions to the debate about a central Holocaust memorial. In 2014, he took a stand in the controversy about the Stolpersteine by Cologne artist Gunter Demnig, favoring their collocations also in Munich.

Quotation

Accolades
 2005  for extraordinary rhetoric performances in the category of politics
 2006 Honorary title Professor of the State of Hesse for his merits on the subject of remembrance 
 2006 Honorar Senator of the Ruprecht-Karls-Universität Heidelberg
 2009 Hessian Cultural Prize

Publications
 Salomon Korn, Micha Brumlik: Europa und der Judenmord. 2005, .
 Salomon Korn: Die fragile Grundlage. Auf der Suche nach der deutsch-jüdischen Normalität. 2003, .
 Salomon Korn: Geteilte Erinnerung. Beiträge zur deutsch-jüdischen Gegenwart. 2001, .
 Helga Krohn, Matthias Morgenstern, Salomon Korn: Ostend. Blick in ein jüdisches Viertel. 2000, .

Articles
 Moschee auf der Alm: Zu schwach, um Fremdes zu ertragen?, in: FAZ, 27 October 2008 (about the construction of synagogues and mosques in Germany)
 München soll stolpern,  Die Zeit (Hamburg), 15 November 2014 (about the Stolperstein controversy in Munich)

Interviews
 Evelyn Finger: Diktaturenvergleich jetzt!, in: Die Zeit (Hamburg), 15 November 2007
 Stefan Reinecke and Christian Semler: Wir brauchen keine Opferkonkurrenz – Die Tageszeitung (Berlin), 6 May 2004
 Peter Voß: „Normalität lässt sich nicht herbeireden“ – SWR-Kulturzeit, November 2004.
 Alexander Wendt: Ein Unbehagen des Westens – focus, 18 September 2006 
 Moritz Reininghaus: Ein Anfang scheint gemacht – Jüdische Zeitung, November 2008

References

External links

Articles for Die Zeit
Medienschelte 2006: Korn and Israel's Ambassador Schimon Stein criticize the representation of the Middle East conflict in German media as "one-sided“

1943 births
Architects from Frankfurt
20th-century Polish Jews
Architects from Lublin
Technische Universität Darmstadt alumni
Living people